Dazhi Road Station serves as an interchange station of Line 1 and Line 6 of Wuhan Metro. It entered revenue service along with the completion of Line 1, Phase 1 on July 28, 2004. The station situates at the intersection of Jinghan Avenue and Dazhi Road, immediately above the historic site of the Dazhimen railway station of the depleted Jinghan Railway, which exited revenue service in 1991. The station is also adjacent to Wuhan Yangtze River Tunnel connecting Dazhi Road in Hankou to Youyi Avenue and Shahu Bridge in Wuchang.

Station layout

Facilities
Dazhi Road Station for Line 1 is a three-story elevated station placed along Jinghan Avenue. The station has two side platforms accommodating a pair of tracks, and is equipped with attended customer service concierges, automatic ticket vending machines, and accessible ramps. A single refuge siding is constructed just south of the station for trains to enter and exit service during peak/off-peak hours.

The station for Line 6 is underground, with an island platform aligned with Dazhi Road.

Exits
There are currently seven exits in service:
 Exit A: Southeastern side of Jinghan Avenue. Accessible to Jiqing Street, Wufangzhai Restaurant.
 Exit B: Northeastern side of Jinghan Avenue. Accessible to the historic site of Dazhimen Station.
 Exit C: Northwestern side of Jinghan Avenue. Accessible to Raycom Skyline.
 Exit D: Southwestern side of Jinghan Avenue.
 Exit E: Northeastern side of Dazhi Road. This exit has two branch exits, E1 and E2, which are in two different directions.
 Exit F: Northwestern side of Dazhi Road.
 Exit G: Southwestern side of Dazhi Road.

Transfers
Bus transfers to Route 622, 711 and 801 are available at Dazhi Road Station.

References

Wuhan Metro stations
Line 1, Wuhan Metro
Line 6, Wuhan Metro